Dianne Brill is a fashion designer, model, author, and former club kid. Brill was a fixture in the 1980s downtown club scene in New York City. Andy Warhol deemed her the "Queen of the Night".

Life and career
Brill was born in Tampa, Florida and at the age of 19, she moved to London, where she became a promoter with Estée Lauder.

In the early 1980s, Brill moved to New York City and became involved in the city's nightlife. She was married to German nightlife impresario Rudolf Piper, who was the owner of Danceteria. Her club life is discussed in the book Disco Bloodbath: A Fabulous but True Tale of Murder in Clubland and the work Party Monster: A Fabulous But True Tale of Murder in Clubland (later becoming the film Party Monster).

Following her life in New York, Brill became an author. In 1992, she released the book Boobs, Boys and High Heels, or How to Get Dressed in Just Under Six Hours, in which she shares her beauty tips and gives fashion and romance advice.

In the 1990s, Brill married German film producer Peter Völkle, with whom she has three children, and they relocated to Germany.

References

Books 
Brill, Dianne (1992). Boobs, Boys and High Heels, or How to Get Dressed in Just Under Six Hours. Penguin Books. .

External links 

American fashion designers
People from Tampa, Florida
Female models from Florida
20th-century American non-fiction writers
1958 births
Living people
20th-century American women
21st-century American women